Campo de Argañán is a subcomarca in the comarca of Comarca de Ciudad Rodrigo in the province of Salamanca, Castile and León.  It contains 18 municipalities:

 Aldea del Obispo
 Campillo de Azaba
 Carpio de Azaba
 Castillejo de Martín Viejo
 Espeja
 Fuentes de Oñoro
 Gallegos de Argañán
 Ituero de Azaba
 La Alameda de Gardón
 La Alamedilla
 La Alberguería de Argañán
 La Bouza
 Puebla de Azaba
 Puerto Seguro
 Saelices el Chico
 Villar de Argañán
 Villar de Ciervo
 Villar de la Yegua.

References

External links
 

Comarcas of the Province of Salamanca